Malik Dinar (Malayalam: മാലിക് ദീനാര്‍) (died 748 CE) was a Muslim scholar and traveller. He was one of the first known Muslims to have come to India in order to propagate Islam in the Indian Subcontinent after the departure of King Cheraman Perumal. Even though historians do not agree on the exact place of his death, it is widely accepted that he died at Kasaragod and that his relics were buried at the Malik Dinar Mosque in Thalangara, Kasaragod. Belonging to the generation of the tabi'i, Malik is called a reliable traditionalist in Sunni sources, and is said to have transmitted from such authorities as Malik ibn Anas and Ibn Hajar. He was the son of a slave from Kabul who became a disciple of Hasan al-Basri. He died just before the epidemic of plague which caused considerable ravages in Basra in 748-49 CE, with various traditions placing his death either at 744-45 or 747-48 CE.

Life
Malik, a preacher and moralist of Basra, made a living as a copyist of the Qur'an, and seems to have been interested in the question of the various readings of the scripture. During his life, Malik had the occasion to follow more or less regularly the teaching of Basran traditionists and mystics as famous as Anas b. Mālik, Ibn Sīrīn, Hasan of Basra and Rabīʿa al-ʿAdawiyya. He was considered to have led an ascetic life himself, and tradition attributed to him several thaumaturgic gifts and miracles, including the ability to walk on water. He seems, moreover, to have been "a most eloquent ḳāṣṣ" or popular orator of religious sermons who admired, in particular, the eloquence of his contemporary al-Ḥaj̲j̲āj̲ "whom he naturally could see at Baṣra." 

According to Ibn al-Faḳīh, "he brought honour to his native town because he was accounted one of the six Baṣrans who were without equals at Kūfa." Later scholars ranging from  Abū Nuʿaym to Ibn al-Jawzī reproduce "whole hosts" of proverbial sayings from him, which clearly reflect the extent to which Malik continued to influence Sunni thinkers of all types. According to Pellat, the explicit articulation of the Sufi ideal of the "inner jihad" (the war against one's own soul)," also finds its original formulation in Malik, who is believed to have said d̲j̲āhidū ahwāʾakum kamā tud̲j̲āhidūn aʿdāʾakum (“fight against your desires just as you fight against your enemies”), in a maxim that would wield considerable influence upon Islamic mystics through the medieval period. Malik also seems to have had an appreciation for the Christian religion, and may have even read parts of the New Testament for spiritual inspiration in imitating the example of Jesus.

Legacy

 Malik Deenar Islamic Academy
 Malik Deenar Mosque
 Malik Deenar Research Congress

See also 
 Islam in Kerala
 Mappila

Bibliography
 Ibn Ḳutayba, Maʿārif, 470, 577
 ’Ibn Saʿd, Ṭabaḳāt, vii/2, 11
 Ṭabarī, iii, 281
 Abu ’l-ʿArab, Ṭabaḳāt ʿulamāʾ Ifrīḳiya, ed. and tr. M. Ben Cheneb, Algiers 1915-20, 17
 Makkī, Ḳūt al-ḳulūb, iv, 187
 Nawawī, Tahd̲h̲īb, 537
 Pellat, Milieu, 99-100, 257.

References

Sunni Sufis
Tabi‘un
Islam in India
Islam in Kerala
Year of birth unknown
648 deaths
Tabi‘un hadith narrators